Ayiti Mon Amour is a 2016 Haitian drama film directed by Guetty Felin. It was screened in the Contemporary World Cinema section at the 2016 Toronto International Film Festival. It was selected as the Haitian entry for the Best Foreign Language Film at the 90th Academy Awards, but it was not nominated. It was the first time Haiti had sent a film for consideration for the Best Foreign Language film.

Plot
A tale of magical realism unfolds in Haiti, five years after a cataclysmic earthquake. A teenager discovers he has a superpower, an old fisherman seeks a cure at sea for his sick wife, and a character tries to escape a story penned by her author.

Cast
 Joakim Cohen
 Anisia Uzeyman
 Jaures Andris

See also
 List of submissions to the 90th Academy Awards for Best Foreign Language Film
 List of Haitian submissions for the Academy Award for Best Foreign Language Film

References

External links
 

2016 films
2016 drama films
Haitian Creole-language films
Haitian drama films
2010s French-language films
English-language Haitian films